John Feeney Hunter (October 19, 1896 – December 19, 1957) was an American lawyer, soldier, and three-term U.S. Representative from Ohio from 1937 to 1943.

Early life and career 
Born in Ford City, Pennsylvania, Hunter moved with his parents in 1907 to Toledo, Ohio, where he attended the public schools. He was graduated from the law department of St. John's University in Toledo in 1918. He was admitted to the bar the same year and commenced practice in the city.

World War I
During the First World War, he enlisted in the United States Army on March 6, 1918, and served until honorably discharged on November 26, 1918.

He served as delegate to the Democratic State conventions in 1932, 1934, 1936, and 1938. Hunter was an alternate to the Democratic National Conventions in 1932 and 1936. He was a member of the State house of representatives in 1933 and 1934 and served in the Ohio State Senate in 1935 and 1936.

Congress 
Hunter was elected as a Democrat to the Seventy-fifth, Seventy-sixth, and Seventy-seventh Congresses (January 3, 1937–January 3, 1943). He was an unsuccessful candidate for reelection in 1942 to the Seventy-eighth Congress and for election in 1944 to the Seventy-ninth Congress. He resumed the practice of law in Toledo, Ohio, and Washington, D.C.

Death
He died in Alexandria, Virginia, December 19, 1957, and was interred in Calvary Cemetery in Toledo.

Sources
 

1896 births
1957 deaths
Democratic Party members of the United States House of Representatives from Ohio
People from Ford City, Pennsylvania
Politicians from Toledo, Ohio
United States Army soldiers
Ohio lawyers
Democratic Party members of the Ohio House of Representatives
Democratic Party Ohio state senators
United States Army personnel of World War I
20th-century American politicians
Lawyers from Toledo, Ohio
20th-century American lawyers